Peter Pumm (born 3 April 1943) is a former Austrian footballer.

Honours
FC Bayern Munich
 Bundesliga: 1968–69
 DFB-Pokal: 1968–69, 1970–71

References

External links
 
 

1943 births
Living people
Footballers from Vienna
Austrian footballers
Austria international footballers
1. Simmeringer SC players
FC Wacker Innsbruck players
FC Bayern Munich footballers
Bundesliga players
Association football defenders
Austrian expatriate sportspeople in West Germany
Expatriate footballers in West Germany
Austrian expatriate footballers